The 2015 IIHF World Women's U18 Championship Division I was the two international under-18 women ice hockey tournaments organised by the International Ice Hockey Federation. The Division I 'A' and Division I Qualification tournaments represent the second and the third tier of the IIHF World Women's U18 Championships.

Division I 'A'
The Division I 'A' tournament was played in Vaujany, France, from 4 to 10 January 2015.

Final standings

Results
All times are local. (CET – UTC+1)

Tournament awards
Best players selected by the directorate:

Division I Qualification
The Division I Qualification tournament was played in Katowice, Poland, from 19 to 25 January 2015.  Denmark won all five games in their debut, earning promotion to the Division I 'A' tournament for 2016.

Final standings

Results
All times are local. (CET – UTC+1)

References

External links 
 IIHF.com

IIHF World Women's U18 Championship – Division I
2015 in French women's sport
2015 in Polish women's sport
International ice hockey competitions hosted by France
International ice hockey competitions hosted by Poland
World